Speed skating at the 2012 Winter Youth Olympics was held at the Eisschnellaufbahn in Innsbruck, Austria, from 14 to 20 January.

Medal summary

Medal table

Boys' events

Girls' events

Multi-medalists
Athlets who have won at least two medals.

Qualification system

Each country could send a maximum of four athletes to the speed skating events of the Winter Youth Olympics. The ISU Junior World Cup competition during the season was used to qualify in the respective distances. The host country (Austria) was given at least one spot.

Each country could send a maximum of four athletes to the speed skating events of the Winter Youth Olympics. The ISU Junior World Cup competition during the season was used to qualify in the respective distances. The host country (Austria) was given at least one spot.

Canada will not send any skaters after the governing body for the sport in the county deemed the event "not developmentally appropriate".

The final allocation of quotas was announced on November 30, 2011.

Qualification times 
Athletes must have met the qualification times after October 10, 2010 to compete.

Qualified nations summary

Qualification
Boys'

Girls'

See also 
 2012 World Junior Speed Skating Championships

References

 
2012 Winter Youth Olympics events
Youth Olympics
Youth Olympics, 2012
2012